Fackenburger Landgraben is a small canal in Schleswig-Holstein, Germany. It was part of the Landwehr (border fortification) of the city of Lübeck.

See also
List of rivers of Schleswig-Holstein

Rivers of Schleswig-Holstein
CFackenburgerLandgraben
Canals in Germany
Rivers of Germany